The Triumph Thunderbird is Triumph motorcycle made in Hinckley, England, and sold since June 2009.  
The name "Thunderbird" is revived from a previous Triumph three-cylinder 885 cc bike. The name was previously applied to a single carburettor version of the 650cc twin Bonneville produced in the mid-1960s for police work. The final iteration was the Thunderbird Sport, last made in 2004.

Design

The Thunderbird is a cruiser with a large 200/50 R17 rear tyre. Design was by Tim Prentice in California. The DOHC eight-valve parallel-twin engine has two balance shafts and a 270° crank, which imitates the sound and feel of a V-twin. The  engine was originally intended to be modular, namely "two-thirds of" a Triumph Rocket III engine; but after four years of development, the only parts in common are the valves.
The engine has two spark plugs per cylinder, which gives better combustion, resulting in lower fuel consumption, cleaner exhaust emissions, and more power. Brakes are double front discs with four-piston callipers, with a single rear disc also with two-piston callipers (ABS as option). Final drive is via a belt drive.

In 2011, the Thunderbird Storm variant model was released featuring the previously-optional  engine fitted as standard, twin headlamps and with a number of black, rather than chrome parts

Reception

A road test of the Thunderbird by Motorcycle News in May 2009,
found that the motorcycle performed well, and handling and braking were significantly superior to comparable American or Japanese cruiser models.
In 2009 and 2010, US motorcycle magazine Cycle World awarded the Thunderbird "Best Cruiser" in its annual "Ten Best Bikes" feature.

Variants
 Triumph Thunderbird with 1,597 cc engine (since 2009)
 Triumph Thunderbird 'Storm', with 1,699 cc engine (since 2011)

References

External links
Triumph Thunderbird at Triumph Motorcycles

Thunderbird (2009)
Cruiser motorcycles
Motorcycles introduced in 2009
Motorcycles powered by straight-twin engines